Andreas Jakob Romberg (27 April 1767 – 10 November 1821) was a German violinist and composer.

Romberg was born in Vechta, in the Duchy of Oldenburg.  He learned the violin from his musician father Gerhard Heinrich Romberg and first performed in public at the age of six. In addition to touring Europe, Romberg also joined the Münster Court Orchestra. The cellist and composer Bernhard Romberg was his cousin.

He joined the court orchestra of the Prince Elector in Bonn (conducted by the Kapellmeister Andrea Luchesi) in 1790, where he met the young Beethoven. He moved to Hamburg in 1793 due to wartime upheavals and joined the Hamburg Opera Orchestra. Romberg's first opera, 'Der Rabe', premiered there in 1794. He also composed his own setting of Messiah (Der Messias).

After a time in Paris, Andreas settled in Hamburg where he became a central figure in the city's musical life. In 1815 he succeeded Louis Spohr as music director at the court of the Duke, in Gotha, Thuringia. He died there on 10 November 1821.

Selected works

Among his compositions are:

 String Quartets, Op. 1
 Violin Concerto No. 1 in E op. 3
 3 Concertant Duos for 2 Violins, Op.4
 Symphony No. 1 in E flat op. 6
 Violin Concerto No. 2 in C op. 8
 Symphony No. 2 in D op. 22
 String Quintet, Op.23
 3 String Quartets, Op.30
 Symphony No. 3 in C op. 33
 3 Flute Quintets, Op. 41
 Was bleibet und was schwindet, Op.42
 Violin Concerto No. 3 in d minor op. 46
 Violin Concerto No. 4 in G op. 50
 Sinfonia alla turca [No. 4] in C op. 51
 Te Deum Laudamus, Op.55
 3 Concertant Duos for 2 Violins, Op.56
 Psalmodie, Op.65
 Dixit Dominus
 3 Violin Sonatas

Further reading
, 1821. There is a substantial obituary in the 19 December 1821 issue (no.51), pp. 849–856 by Rochlitz.

External links
https://www.youtube.com/watch?v=H3EzhcJTGCI
Andreas Romberg YouTube Playlist
 
 
  Keith Anderson. Liner notes to 'Romberg:Flute Quintets', Naxos CD 8.554765

1767 births
1821 deaths
People from Vechta
People from the Duchy of Oldenburg
German composers
German violinists
German male violinists
String quartet composers